The 1987–88 Cypriot Second Division was the 33rd season of the Cypriot second-level football league. Keravnos won their 2nd title.

Format
Fifteen teams participated in the 1987–88 Cypriot Second Division. All teams played against each other twice, once at their home and once away. The team with the most points at the end of the season crowned champions. The first two teams were promoted to 1988–89 Cypriot First Division. The last three teams were relegated to the 1988–89 Cypriot Third Division.

Changes from previous season
Teams promoted to 1987–88 Cypriot First Division
 APEP
 Anagennisi Deryneia

Teams relegated from 1986–87 Cypriot First Division
 Omonia Aradippou
 Ermis Aradippou

Teams promoted from 1986–87 Cypriot Third Division
 Elpida Xylofagou
 Ethnikos Defteras

Teams relegated to 1987–88 Cypriot Third Division
 Orfeas Athienou
 Apollon Lympion

League standings

See also
 Cypriot Second Division
 1987–88 Cypriot First Division
 1987–88 Cypriot Cup

Sources

Cypriot Second Division seasons
Cyprus
1987–88 in Cypriot football